The Bahía de Algeciras Campus UCA is a branch of the University of Cádiz (UCA). Its facilities are located in Algeciras and La Linea de la Concepción, Spain.

Structure
The Bahia de Algeciras campus is operated by the Municipal University Foundation.  The Foundation is located in the former Military Hospital of Algeciras. Its board is formed by a president (the mayor of the city) and a vice president (the Councillor for University Studies), as well as municipal representatives, students, professors, unions and companies in the region, and the management board.

Teaching
The Algeciras campus includes the following schools and programs

 The Higher Polytechnic School, which offers degrees in Engineering, Technical Industrial Engineering and Public Works Engineering programs that work toward a civil engineering degree.
 the University School of Nursing.

 The University School of Judicial and Economic Studies Francisco Tomás y Valiente. The law degree includes specialization in Law and Business, Maritime and Harbour Law, or Penitentiary Law.  There are degrees in Business Science, Labor Relations, and Growth and Public Administration  
 The University School of Tourism and Social Work  awards diplomas in Tourism and Social Work. 
 The University School of Teaching is located in La Línea de la Concepción.

See also
 Cádiz Campus
 Jerez de la Frontera Campus
 Puerto real campus

References

External links
Wikimedia Commons hosts multimedia content about Campus Bahía de Algeciras. 
Higher Polytechnic School of ALgeciras
University School of Nursing of Algeciras
University School of Judicial and Economic Studies of the Campus of Gibraltar
University School of Teaching

Universities in Andalusia
Buildings and structures in Algeciras
La Línea de la Concepción